Lake Como is a lake located by Como, New York. Fish species present in the lake include black crappie, bluegill, white sucker, yellow perch, tiger muskie, black bullhead, channel catfish, rock bass, pickerel, and pumpkinseed sunfish. There is access via boat launch for a fee on the north shore off County Road 103.

References

Lakes of New York (state)
Lakes of Cayuga County, New York